Hanover Central High School (HCHS) is a 9–12 public high school located in Cedar Lake, Indiana.  It is the only high school in the Hanover Community School Corporation.

Academics

In the 2021 U.S. News & World Report annual survey of high schools, Hanover Central ranked 186th in Indiana and 8,004th nationally.

Demographics
The demographic breakdown of the 722 students enrolled in 2019–20 was:
Male – 48.6%
Female – 51.4%
Native American/Alaskan – 0.1%
Asian – 1.1%
Black – 2.4%
Hispanic – 12.0%
White – 80.3%
Multiracial – 4.0%

28.5% of the students were eligible for free or reduced-cost lunch. For 2019–20, Hanover Central was a Title I school.

Athletics
The Hanover Central Wildcats are members of the Greater South Shore conference.  The school colors are cardinal red and Columbia blue.  The following Indiana High School Athletic Association (IHSAA) sanctioned sports are offered:

Basketball (boys)
Cross country (girls and boys)
Football (boys)
Golf (girls and boys)
Soccer (girls and boys)
Softball (girls)
State champion – 2004
Tennis (girls and boys)
Track (girls and boys)
Volleyball (girls)
Wrestling (boys)

See also
 List of high schools in Indiana

References

External links

Schools in Lake County, Indiana
Public high schools in Indiana
1966 establishments in Indiana
Educational institutions established in 1966